The Royal Commission into the Robodebt Scheme is a royal commission established on 18 August 2022 by the Australian Government pursuant to the Royal Commissions Act 1902.  The Royal Commissioner is required to provide a final report by 30 June 2023.

Background

In June 2020, the Greens and Labor called for a Royal Commission into Robodebt, to 'determine those responsible for the scheme, and its impact on Australians'. These calls have been reiterated by university academics, and by the Australian Council of Social Service (ACOSS), which stated that "although some restitution has been delivered to victims of Robodebt, they have not received justice".

In May 2022, the final report from the second Senate inquiry into the Robodebt scheme recommended a Royal Commission, "to completely understand how the failures of the Income Compliance Program came to pass, and why they were allowed to continue for so long despite the dire impacts on people issued with debts".

In June 2020 Labor had stated that only a Royal Commission would be able to obtain the truth about Robodebt. Labor subsequently budgeted  in its election costings for the 2022 election for a Royal Commission into the Robodebt scheme.   ACOSS chief executive Cassandra Goldie welcomed this saying "The Robodebt affair was not just a maladministration scandal, it was a human tragedy that resulted in people taking their lives".

Following Labor's election win, Prime Minister Anthony Albanese announced the Royal Commission into the Robodebt Scheme, with Letters Patent issued by Governor-General David Hurley on 25 August 2022. The Letters Patent appointed former Queensland Supreme Court Justice Catherine Holmes as Royal Commissioner.

Terms of reference
The terms of reference outlined in the Letters Patent require the commissioner to examine:
 The establishment, design and implementation of the Robodebt scheme
 The use of third party debt collectors under the Robodebt scheme
 Concerns raised following the implementation of the Robodebt scheme
 The intended or actual outcomes of the Robodebt scheme

Powers

Royal Commissions have powers to issue a summons to a person to appear before the Commission at a hearing to give evidence or to produce documents specified in the summons; require witnesses to take an oath or give an affirmation; and require a person to deliver documents to the Commission at a specified place and time. A person served with a summons or a notice to produce documents must comply with that requirement, or face prosecution for an offence. A Royal Commission may authorise the Australian Federal Police to execute search warrants.

Reports
The Royal Commissioner was initially required to provide a final report by 18 April 2023, however in February 2023, the reporting date was extended to 30 June 2023.

See also

List of Australian royal commissions

References

External links 

Commonwealth of Australia royal commissions
2022 establishments in Australia
2022 in Australia
Albanese Government